Mottingham railway station is a station situated on Court Road between Eltham and Mottingham, in the Royal Borough of Greenwich, south-east London. The station is located in Travelcard Zone 4, on the Dartford Loop Line between Lee and New Eltham.

The station is operated by Southeastern.

History

The station was first opened by the South Eastern Railway on 1 September 1866 as Eltham for Mottingham. In 1892 it was renamed Eltham & Mottingham. In 1927 it became Mottingham.

The goods yard on the down side to the west of the platforms included a large coal office. A footbridge linking the two platforms was opened in the 1890s. Half a dozen sidings used for rolling stock were built around 1900 on the down side opposite the goods yard.

A three-storey high substation was built next to the station when the Dartford Loop Line was electrified in 1926. The substation was demolished in 1957 later to be replaced by more powerful substations at New Eltham and Hither Green.

On 19 March 1946 the station was the location of a fatal accident when an electric passenger train collided with a stationary light engine that was waiting to move into the sidings. The driver of the passenger train was killed and 13 passengers injured.

In 1955 the platforms were lengthened to take ten carriage trains. The goods yard closed and five of the six rolling stock sidings were decommissioned in 1968. The signal box closed the following year. In 1992 the platforms were lengthened again and in 2012 the platforms were extended for a final time in order to take twelve carriage trains.

The up side ticket office has a mixture of structures, the white clapboard dating from the original station of 1866, with brown brick construction of 1957 and sliding doors installed in 1988.

Location
Mottingham Station is situated in the town of Mottingham, on Court Road close to its junction with the A20 Sidcup bypass and opposite The Tarn nature reserve and garden. The A20 road outside is a popular hitchhiking spot to Dover.

The station is served by London bus routes 124, 126, 161, 624.

Facilities

The station has two platforms. Platform 1 is the up platform for westbound services to London and Platform 2 is the down platform for eastbound services to Kent. A ticket hall is situated on the up side but the station does not have ticket gates. There is an accessible toilet, as well as separate toilets for women and men. There is step free access to both platforms.

The station has a car park.

Services

The typical off-peak service in trains per hour is:

The station is also served by a single peak hour return service between Dartford and London Blackfriars.

References

External links

An enthusiast's history of Mottingham station

Railway stations in the Royal Borough of Greenwich
Former South Eastern Railway (UK) stations
Railway stations in Great Britain opened in 1866
Railway stations served by Southeastern
Buildings and structures in Eltham
1866 establishments in England